Derek Dinger (born March 28, 1987) is a German professional ice hockey defenceman who is currently playing for EC Kassel Huskies of the DEL2.

Playing career
Dinger originally joined the DEG Metro Stars for the 2010–11 season following the folding of hometown team the Kassel Huskies on September 2, 2010. After two seasons with the Stars, Dinger left to join ERC Ingolstadt on a one-year contract on May 11, 2012.

From August 2012 to May 2014 Derek Dinger played for the ERC Ingolstadt in the DEL and scored in 53 main round games one goal and five assists. At the end of the following season he won the German Championship with the ERCI.

After a solitary season with Schwenninger Wild Wings, Dinger signed a one-year contract with Augsburger Panther on April 14, 2015. In the 2016–17 season, Dinger reached the play-off quarter-finals with the Panthers.

Career statistics

References

External links

1987 births
Living people
Augsburger Panther players
DEG Metro Stars players
Eisbären Berlin players
ERC Ingolstadt players
Kassel Huskies players
Schwenninger Wild Wings players
German ice hockey defencemen